Margherita is a 1848 opera by the then 23-year old Italian composer Jacopo Foroni.

Recording
 Alessandra Volpe, Wexford Opera Festival Timothy Myers Radio 3

References
 
Operas by Jacopo Foroni
Italian-language operas
1848 operas
Operas